Angiotech was a pharmaceutical company in Vancouver, British Columbia, Canada. Angiotech was founded in 1992 by William L. Hunter, Lindsay Machan, and Larry Arsenault. It sought to develop innovative technologies and medical products primarily for local diseases and complications associated with medical device implants, surgical interventions and acute injury.

In April 2010, Angiotech acquired Haemacure manufacturing to develop human biological adhesives, hemostats and therapeutic proteins.

In 2017, Angiotech was acquired by a consortium led by the U.S. healthcare investment firm Vivo Capital and China's ZQ Capital.

References

External links
 Official site

Pharmaceutical companies of Canada
Biotechnology companies of Canada
1992 establishments in British Columbia
Pharmaceutical companies established in 1992
Biotechnology companies established in 1992